First United Methodist Church (historically known as First Methodist Episcopal Church) is a historic church at 200 S. 200 East in Salt Lake City, Utah.

It was designed by architect Frederick Albert Hale and was built in 1905. Hale designed dozens of Salt Lake City buildings and a number of churches outside the state, but this was his only church in Utah.

It was added to the National Register of Historic Places in 1995.

References

External links
Official website

Methodist churches in Utah
Churches on the National Register of Historic Places in Utah
Churches completed in 1905
Churches in Salt Lake City
National Register of Historic Places in Salt Lake City
1905 establishments in Utah